Nadezhda  (Hope) was a cockroach that was sent into space during the Foton-M 3 bio-satellite flight between September 14 and 26, 2007 by Russian scientists. Scientists monitoring the mission from Voronezh announced that Nadezhda had successfully produced 33 offspring on Earth, these 33 insects being the first earthlings known to be conceived in conditions of weightlessness. Nadezhda and the rest of the insects were traveling inside a sealed special container, and a video-camera was filming the whole process.

What was considered unnatural for the newborn cockroaches was that their carapace had darkened in colour much earlier, in comparison with natural-condition cockroaches who develop that darker tone later in their life cycle. But the rest of the conditions and capacities of the cockroaches remained normal. Later it was reported that Nadezhda's grandchildren, born to one of the space-born insects, had given birth on Earth to normal cockroaches, with a life cycle and development similar to that of any other cockroach.

References

Animals in space
Individual cockroaches